The Tel Aviv Marathon is a major marathon held annually in Tel Aviv, Israel, in February. Inaugurated in 1981, it was held annually until 1994. In 2009, it was revived and has been taking place annually since, attracting about 40,000 runners in 2022. The race was not held in 2021 due to the COVID-19 pandemic and a digital event was held instead.

The 2022 edition took place on 25 February. Vincent Kipsang Rono of Kenya and Bikaya Mantamar of Israel were the men’s and women’s winners, respectively.

History

The marathon is one of Tel Aviv's core annual international events. The Tel Aviv Marathon is a multi-course event allowing both professional and hobbyist runners to take part. The event includes an Inline Skating Half Marathon, and a 30 km Handcycle race for people with special needs. Marathon runners run along the seashore and main streets of Tel Aviv, an official UNESCO World Heritage Site.

Some 35,000 runners were expected to take part in the 2013 marathon, with a range of different courses on offer. Due to unexpectedly high temperatures, the marathon did not take place as originally scheduled on March 15, 2013. Other races scheduled as part of the event, including the half marathon, 10 km races, 4.2 km race, and children's race did take place, but started earlier in the day than originally scheduled.  Despite the precautions, one runner died, and twelve others were seriously injured.
 
For the 2020 edition of the marathon, although foreigners were initially banned from competing due to concerns regarding the coronavirus pandemic, the Ministry of Health partially lifted the ban days before the competition and allowed "diplomats, foreign residents, and international residents" that were already in Israel to participate in the marathon.

In 2021, the marathon did not take place due to the coronavirus pandemic. Instead, a virtual event was held, using a dedicated app which remained available for a week and a half to allow runners to choose a time and location of their choice and receive information on their distance and running time in the app.

Course records 

The men's course record is 2:10:11, set in the 2023 edition by Dominic Kipngeno Mibei of Kenya.

The Israeli men's course record is 2:27:25, set in the 2017 edition by Marhu Teferi.

The women's course record is 2:35:51, set in the 2017 edition by Margaret Njuguna of Kenya.

The Israeli women's course record is 2:51:23, set in the 2019 edition by Irene-Orr Konovalov.

Past winners 
Key: 

Notes: 1981 was the inaugural year. The course used for the 1989 race was 1,750 m too short, due to marking mistakes.
https://arrs.run/HP_TelAvivMa.htm

Prize Money (ADR qualified runners)

Quality Performances

See also

Jerusalem Marathon
Tiberias Marathon
Sports in Israel

References

External links
The first marathon runner wasn't Greek, he was Jewish

Marathons in Israel
Annual sporting events in Israel
1981 establishments in Israel
Recurring sporting events established in 1981